Tofy Mussivand (Persian:توفیق موسیوند, born c. 1943 in Varkaneh, Hamadan Province, Iran) is an Iranian-Canadian medical engineer of Kurdish origin who invented an Artificial Cardiac Pump, a device that pumps blood and takes over the function of breathing during a heart surgery.

He is currently Professor of Surgery and Engineering at the University of Ottawa and Carleton University; Chair and Director, Cardiovascular Devices Division of the University of Ottawa Heart Institute (UOHI); and Medical Devices Program of both the University of Ottawa and Carleton University. He is an honorary member of the Iranian Academy of Medical Sciences.

Biography 
Mussivand was born to Kurdish parents in the village of Varkaneh in Hamadan province. Before leaving Varkaneh to study at Tehran, he was a goat herder. He studied engineering at Tehran University and University of Alberta and fled Iran in 1957. He has worked for the Canadian government, crown corporations, and the private sector.  Mussivand went on to receive his doctorate in Medical Engineering and Medical Sciences at the University of Akron and Northeastern Ohio Universities College of Medicine. Thereafter, Mussivand joined the Cleveland Clinic Hospital and Research Foundation. In 1989, Mussivand returned to Canada.

Selected publications

References

Living people
Canadian cardiologists
Iranian Academy of Medical Sciences
Kurdish scientists
University of Akron alumni
Year of birth missing (living people)
People from Hamadan Province